Vakhushti Khan (d. 1667/69) was a Safavid official and royal gholam from the Georgian Orbeliani clan, who served as the governor (hakem) of Shushtar from September 1632 up to his death in 1667 or 1669. His descendants continued to flourish in Shushtar well into Nader Shah's era (r. 1736–1747).

Vakhushti was a son of the Georgian nobleman Aslamaz and had at least two other brothers named Otar (Zu al-Faqār) and Gorjasbi (Mansur), who held prominent positions as well. According to Alexander Orbeliani (1802–1869), he had one more brother named Kaykhosrow. He was a close relative of Rodam, the wife of Shah Navaz Khan (Vakhtang V).

His name Vakhushti derives from Old Iranian vahišta- ("paradise", superlative of veh "good", i.e., "superb, excellent"). Its equivalent in Middle Persian is wahišt and in New Persian behešt.

Vakhusti's second son, Aslamas (also known as Aslan), served as commander of the élite gholam corps (qollar-aghasi) in 1693–1695, and as governor (beglarbeg) of Qandahar in 1694–95, or 1696–1697.

References

Sources
 
  
 
 

1660s deaths
Iranian people of Georgian descent
History of Khuzestan Province
Safavid governors
Shia Muslims from Georgia (country)
Nobility of Georgia (country)
17th-century people of Safavid Iran
Safavid ghilman